Rypefjord is a village in Hammerfest Municipality in Troms og Finnmark county, Norway. The village is located just south of the town of Hammerfest on the western side of the large island of Kvaløya. Rypefjord was the main population centre of the former municipality of Sørøysund. Today, Rypefjord is considered a suburb of the town of Hammerfest. Fjordtun primary school is located in Rypefjord.

Media gallery

See also
List of villages in Finnmark

References

Hammerfest
Villages in Finnmark
Populated places of Arctic Norway